The Valdosta Commercial Historic District in Valdosta, Georgia is a historic district that was listed on the National Register of Historic Places in 1983 and expanded in 2002.  It includes 81 contributing resources and 23 non-contributing resources.  The original listing included all or part of nine city blocks in a roughly square  area.  The expansion listing added  with six contributing buildings and its documentation revised the classification of some of the original area's properties.

It includes:
Lowndes County Courthouse (1906), designed by Frank P. Milburn (1868-1926), separately listed on the NRHP in 1980
111 South Ashley Street, designed by Stephen F. Fulgham (1857-1928)
Converse-Girardin Building, 121-123 North Patterson, designed by Stephen F. Fulgham
First Baptist Church (1898), designed by Stephen F. Fulgham
U.S. Courthouse and Post Office (1908), the current Valdosta City Hall, designed by Lloyd Greer (1885-
1952)
Daniel Ashley Hotel, designed by Edward E. Dougherty (1876-1943) of Dougherty and Gardner.
 First Methodist Church (1905).

References

Historic districts on the National Register of Historic Places in Georgia (U.S. state)
Victorian architecture in Georgia (U.S. state)
National Register of Historic Places in Lowndes County, Georgia
Romanesque Revival architecture in Georgia (U.S. state)